Leg bones are the bones found in the leg. These can include the following:
 Femur – The bone in the thigh.
 Patella – The knee cap
 Tibia – The shin bone, the larger of the two leg bones located below the knee cap
 Fibula – The smaller of the two leg bones located below the patella

Bones of the lower limb